The office of Minister-President of Thuringia was established at the state's first formation in 1920. On 23 July 1952 the state, then part of the socialist German Democratic Republic (East Germany), was abolished. On 3 October 1990, the state was re-established and joined the Federal Republic of Germany; since then it has been one of the country's sixteen constituent states (Länder).

State of Thuringia (1920–1945) 
 Minister-President of the State of Thuringia
Political Party:

Thuringia (1945–1952) 
Political Party:

Free State of Thuringia (1990–present) 

 Minister-President of the Free State of Thuringia
Political Party:

See also
Thuringia
Landtag of Thuringia

 
Ministers-President
Thuringia
Thuringia